Maxillaria rufescens, the light fox-red maxillaria, is a species of orchid native to Trinidad and the Amazon Basin in Colombia, Ecuador, Peru, Bolivia, Venezuela, The Guianas and Brazil. The plant grows at elevations of 200 to 2000 meters, and grows up to 1 inches (3 to 4 centimeters).

References

External links 

rufescens
Orchids of South America
Orchids of Trinidad
Plants described in 1836